In Greek mythology, Buphagus (Ancient Greek: Βουφάγος), son of Iapetus and Thornaxe, was an Arcadian hero and husband of Promne. He received the wounded Iphicles, the brother of Heracles, into his house, and took care of him until he died. Buphagus was afterwards killed by Artemis for having pursued her.

Buphagus (which means bull, cattle-eater) was also a surname of Heracles, Lepreus, and others, who were believed to have eaten a whole bull at once.

Notes

Sources

Deeds of Artemis
Epithets of Heracles
Arcadian mythology